

407001–407100 

|-id=016
| 407016 Danielerdag ||  || Daniel Erdag (1999–2017) loved astronomy, chemistry and sports. He was a member of the Lomonosov Tournaments in astronomy, chemistry, geography and global studies. || 
|}

407101–407200 

|-bgcolor=#f2f2f2
| colspan=4 align=center | 
|}

407201–407300 

|-id=243
| 407243 Krapivin ||  || Vladislav Krapivin (1938-2020) is a Russian writer and poet, whose books involve high ideals of friendship, love, honor and loyalty. The main theme of his work is adult responsibility for children. The writer has created much fiction about space and parallel worlds || 
|}

407301–407400 

|-bgcolor=#f2f2f2
| colspan=4 align=center | 
|}

407401–407500 

|-bgcolor=#f2f2f2
| colspan=4 align=center | 
|}

407501–407600 

|-bgcolor=#f2f2f2
| colspan=4 align=center | 
|}

407601–407700 

|-bgcolor=#f2f2f2
| colspan=4 align=center | 
|}

407701–407800 

|-bgcolor=#f2f2f2
| colspan=4 align=center | 
|}

407801–407900 

|-bgcolor=#f2f2f2
| colspan=4 align=center | 
|}

407901–408000 

|-bgcolor=#f2f2f2
| colspan=4 align=center | 
|}

References 

407001-408000